The 2018 Icelandic Men's Football League Cup is the 23rd season of the Icelandic Men's League Cup, a pre-season professional football competition in Iceland. The tournament involves twenty-four clubs from the top two leagues in Iceland, Úrvalsdeild karla and 1. deild karla, and uses a combination of group and knockout rounds to determine which team is the winner of the tournament. 

The tournament began on 9 February and will conclude with the final on 5 April 2018.

Participating teams

League tables

Group 1

Group 2

Group 3

Group 4

Knockout stage

Semi-finals
The top team of each group will enter the semi-finals stage.

Final
The final will be played on 9 April 2018.

Top goalscorers

References

External links
Soccerway

2018 domestic association football cups
2018 in Icelandic football
Icelandic Men's Football League Cup